Guerri is a surname. Notable people with the surname include:

Kamel Guerri (born 1968), Algerian alpine skier
Mourad Guerri (born 1975), Algerian alpine skier
Ruth Guerri, American actress
Sergio Guerri (1905–1992), Italian Roman Catholic Cardinal
Simone Guerri (born 1982), Italian footballer